Randi J. Rost (born February 24, 1960) is a computer graphics professional and frequent contributor to graphics standards. He was an early participant in the personal computer industry, creating a game called King Cribbage for the Apple II computer in 1981 and publishing numerous instructional and review articles in trade publications.

He currently manages relationships with a variety of game developers and other graphics ISVs at Intel Corporation. He participates in a number of internal strategic planning activities and is a contributor to corporate graphics strategy. He was a founding member of the Khronos Group and has represented Intel on the Khronos Group Board of Promoters. He came up with the name Khronos (a transliteration for the Greek word "time") during this group's formative period, and for this was awarded a pound of smoked salmon. In 1993, Randi won the National Computer Graphics Association (NCGA) Award for the Advancement of Graphics Standards, given to recognize the individual who has shown dedication to the development and use of computer graphics standards.

Prior to joining Intel, he was a driver engineering manager and then director of developer relations at 3Dlabs, the company that led the development of the OpenGL Shading Language (or GLSL). Randi was a core contributor to the development of the OpenGL Shading Language and the OpenGL API that supports it, as well as one of the first programmers to design and implement shaders using this technology. He led the 3Dlabs team devoted to educating developers and helping them take advantage of new graphics hardware technology.

In the late 1980s, he was a co-architect of PEX, a 3D graphics extension to the X Window System. He was a founding member of the Picture-Level Benchmark organization that was later merged into SPEC and has become the leading creator of vendor-neutral graphics benchmarking tools. He was a member of the OpenGL ARB when it was originally formed in 1991. He has given numerous talks and lectures on a variety of computer graphics subjects at SIGGRAPH, GDC, Eurographics, and other notable conferences.

Published Work 
OpenGL Shading Language, Third Edition, Randi J. Rost, Bill Licea-Kane, Addison-Wesley Professional, July 30, 2009. 

OpenGL Shading Language, Second Edition, Randi J. Rost, Addison-Wesley Professional, January 25, 2006.  
OpenGL Shading Language, Randi J. Rost, Addison-Wesley Professional, February 12, 2004. 

X and MOTIF Quick Reference Guide, Second Edition, Randi J. Rost, Digital Press, October 1993. 

X and MOTIF Quick Reference Guide, Randi J. Rost, Digital Press, September 13, 1990.

See also 
OpenGL
Intel
3Dlabs
Khronos Group

External links
Intel homepage
3Dlabs homepage
Official Randi J. Rost Bio

Computer graphics professionals
Living people
1960 births